CubeRover is a class of planetary rover with a standardized modular format meant to accelerate the pace of space exploration. The idea is equivalent to that of the successful CubeSat format, with standardized off-the-shelf components and architecture to assemble small units that will be all compatible, modular, and inexpensive.

The rover class concept is being developed by Astrobotic Technology in partnership with Carnegie Mellon University, and it is partly funded by NASA awards. A Carnegie Mellon University initiative - completely independent of NASA awards - developed Iris, the first flightworthy cuberover. Its 2022 lunar mission will make CMU the first university in the world, and the first American entity, to successfully develop and pilot a lunar rover.

Overview

Concept

The idea is to create a practical modular concept similar that used for CubeSats and apply it to rovers, effectively creating a new standardized architecture of small modular planetary rovers with compatible parts, systems, and even instruments so that each mission can be easily tailored to its objectives. The rovers are expendable and do not use solar arrays for electrical power, depending  solely on non-rechargeable batteries. This allows it to be lighter, have a larger cooling radiator panel for electronics, and have a simpler avionics design. 

The CubeRover program intends that standardizing small rover design with a common architecture will open access to planetary bodies for companies, governments, and universities around the world at a low cost, while increasing functionality, just as the CubeSat has in Earth orbit. This would motivate other members of the space exploration community to develop new systems and instruments that are all compatible with the CubeRover's architecture.

Development

In May 2017 Astrobotic Technology, in partnership with Carnegie Mellon University, were selected by NASA's Small Business Innovation Research (SBIR) to receive a $125,000 award to develop a small lunar rover architecture capable of performing small-scale science and exploration on the Moon and other planetary surfaces.  During Phase I, the team built a 2-kg rover and performed engineering studies to determine the architecture of a novel chassis, power, computing systems, software and navigation techniques.  

In future missions, CubeRovers may be designed to take advantage of lander-based systems to shelter for the cold lunar night, that lasts for 14 Earth days. Similarly, future larger CubeRovers may be able to incorporate thermal insulation and systems qualified for ultra-low temperatures.

CMU students developed the first flightworthy cuberover, Iris. Iris will fly to the Moon on Astrobotic's Peregrine lander in 2022.

References

External links

CubeRover official web site
Astrobotic to Develop CubeRover Standard for Planetary Surface Mobility . Astrobotic Technology. Press release on 4 May 2017.
CubeRover to Develop Next Generation Planetary Rovers in Luxembourg. Astrobotic Technology, press release on 27 September 2018.
 

Planetary rovers
Lunar rovers
Space robots
Peregrine Payloads